Gift Links (born 2 October 1998) is a South African professional soccer player who plays as a forward for Danish Superliga club AGF and South African national team.

Career
Links was part of the Cape Town City team which won the MTN 8 Cup in 2018. On 1 September 2019, Links joined Danish Superliga club Aarhus Gymnastikforening on a contract until June 2024. He made his debut for the club on 15 September in a 3–0 home win over AaB, coming on as an 82nd-minute substitute for Jakob Ankersen.

Career statistics

Club

International

Honours
Cape Town City
MTN 8: 2018

References

1998 births
Living people
South African soccer players
South African expatriate soccer players
Association football forwards
South African Premier Division players
Egyptian Premier League players
Danish Superliga players
Pyramids FC players
Cape Town City F.C. (2016) players
Aarhus Gymnastikforening players
Expatriate footballers in Egypt
Expatriate men's footballers in Denmark
South African expatriate sportspeople in Denmark
South Africa international soccer players